Nikos Vavilis (born 5 August 1970) is a retired Greek football defender.

References

1970 births
Living people
Atromitos F.C. players
Kalamata F.C. players
Ionikos F.C. players
Panachaiki F.C. players
Thrasyvoulos F.C. players
Super League Greece players
Association football defenders
Footballers from Athens
Greek footballers